The Foundery (or Foundry), in Moorfields, was the first London foundry for casting brass cannon for the British Board of Ordnance. The building subsequently served as the first Wesleyan Methodist house of worship, and an important meeting place for the early Methodist community. In 1778, the Methodist congregation was moved to the nearby purpose-built Wesley's Chapel on City Road.

History

Cannon foundry
Also known as the King's Foundery or Bagley's Foundry (after its founder Matthew Bagley), it was built in Windmill Hill (today Tabernacle Street) in Moorfields on the northern side of the City of London. It supplied cannons for the nearby Honourable Artillery Company, but was closed in 1716 after a steam explosion, caused by dampness in a mould, which killed Bagley and 16 others. A new cannon foundry was subsequently opened on the Board of Ordnance's Woolwich site, southeast of London.

Wesleyan chapel
The building was later used from 1739 as the first Methodist chapel in London by John Wesley (a plaque in Tabernacle Street marks the nearby location). Wesley purchased the building's lease for £115, then spent a further £700–£800 on refurbishment costs, creating a chapel able to accommodate 1,500 people, plus a smaller meeting room. Wesley first preached in the building on 11 November 1739 and another leading Methodist Thomas Maxfield was there in 1742. This first Methodist chapel hosted the first Methodist conference in June 1744. The Foundery complex also provided a free dispensary which opened in 1746 and the Methodists appointed an apothecary and a surgeon. The following year there was a free school with two masters teaching 60 children. In 1747 the complex gained a lending society and in 1748 there was an adjacent almshouse.

The Methodist society was moved to the nearby purpose-built Wesley's Chapel in 1778.

References

Foundries in the United Kingdom
Government munitions production in the United Kingdom
Industrial buildings in London
Methodist churches in London
Military history of London
Dispensaries in London